The Battle of Los Yébenes (24 March 1809) was the clash of the Regiment of Polish Lancers of the Legion of the Vistula with multiple regiments of Spanish cavalry, near the Spanish village (today municipality) of Los Yébenes. The heavily outnumbered Polish regiment, led by Colonel Jan Konopka, was attacked by surprise and almost defeated by the larger Spanish force.

Background 
General Valance's Polish Division of the Corps of Gen. Horace Sébastiani left Toledo on 20 March and marched south-west in order to take Andalusia. On the evening of 23 March they stopped to rest in the town of Mora. The lancers (591 men in 4 squadrons) could have spent the night in nearby Orgaz at the foot of the mountains, but Colonel Konopka chose instead the large village of Los Yébenes (also called Yevenes or Ivenes), which the Poles had recognized as a comfortable place to rest during their previous patrols in that area. However the place was very difficult to organize for defense. As an eyewitness, soldier of the Regiment Sergeant Kajetan Wojciechowski, wrote:

This position was extremely dangerous for cavalry, because the only way out of the valley zigzagged through the mountain, from which any step to the right, where sky-high rocks were hanging over our heads, or to the left, because of abyss under our feet, was impossible to make, and it was the only way we had take if attacked by the enemy.
According to this description, the resting place for the night was a poor choice, because it could easily turn into a death trap for sleeping soldiers, who had no space to form themselves for the battle, and no safe way of retreat. In fact, the valley was vast enough to fight a battle of large forces, but for a single regiment going up against a whole army, it was very disadvantageous. According to Kirkor, the regiment was under attack by seven regiments of the Spanish cavalry and two batteries of horse artillery.

Colonel Konopka might have chosen such a place to spend the night because neither the French nor the Poles knew the Spanish forces were concentrating nearby. The regiment's companies were quartered throughout the village along with the wagons of the supply column. In the center of the village stayed the fifth company under Captain Jan Szulc. This company on that night was the service detachment of the regiment. Around the village pickets were posted.

Battle 

The night of the 24th was foggy. The sentries heard suspicious sounds and informed the colonel, "but he calmed all his officers, assuring them that the enemy was several days march from here, near the Guadiana river"; he was mistaken, since facing him and hidden by the fog was the new Army of La Mancha, commanded by Count de Cartaojal, who at seven in the morning mounted an attacking front against the Lancers, who at that moment had just got out of bed. In fact, according to the French Light Cavalry regulations, the reveille should be called at 6:00

Lancers of the 5th company engaged their enemies at once. The rest of the regiment was forming in disarrayed squadrons by the church in the center of the village. Suddenly the fog lifted and the Poles caught sight of dense ranks of the Spanish cavalry, and two batteries of horse artillery as well. Colonel Konopka, seeing great predominance of the enemy, gave the only possible order which was to retreat toward the main French force.

Squadrons turned around and - in the marching column - rushed toward Orgaz, with the colonel and major Andrzej Ruttie in the front. The 5th company protected the rest of the column as the rearguard.

Soon the lancers, led by Konopka, met two regiments of the Spanish cavalry. Konopka cried: "Forward, boys!" and then the foremost 8th company men leveled their lances attacking furiously. It was the Royal Carabineers Regiment (Spanish carabineros reales), one of the better regiments in the Spanish Army who blocked the narrow road on the edge of a precipice without any chance to go forward or back.

It was a merciless fight. Lancers were prevailing with their lances, and carabineers, armed with swords, were – from the very beginning – condemned to defeat. In the terrible melee, where only few soldiers could fight back the attacking Poles, the carabineers, pressed between their attackers and the following Spanish regiment, had no chance. Some hurled themselves in despair into a stony river while others tried to climb the rocky slopes above. Those on the road died.

The lancers' attack completely surprised the Spanish soldiers, who moments before were absolutely sure they would prevail. Now, seeing their front lines smashed by the enemy, they began to move back, and those in last ranks started to retreat. The lancers were pressing, and soon they hewed their way to a wider part of the road. There, separated from the Spanish soldiers, they went into gallop.

Colonel Konopka, along with Major Ruttie and dozen of lancers, left the regiment, which finally reached the open field, and began to form defense lines to repulse the Spanish cavalry, which flowed out from the canyon. The Polish colonel safely reached Mora, where the main forces of General Valance stayed, convinced that the regiment was lost. The regiment however, led by one of the squadrons' COs, Captain Telesfor Kostanecki, fought its way through the enemy's lines, and in a roundabout way – by Consuegra – arrived few hours later in Mora.

Aftermath 
In the battle of Yébenes the regiment of Polish Lancers suffered significant losses. Lieutenant Stanisław Moszyński (Molzinski) was killed. He died when dueling with lieutenant Zawadzki Captains Jan Szulc and Kajetan Stokowski, as well as Lieutenant Stawierski and surgeon Jan Gryll, all wounded, were taken prisoners (the retreat was so difficult that the regiment could not evacuate its wounded). Overall, between 8 March and 15 April the regiment lost 89 men. Subtracting from that the 47 who were taken prisoner and noting that subsequent losses of the regiments were negligible if any, the remaining number of lost lancers was 42, which was probably the number killed in the clash of Yébenes.

The regiment also lost all of its wagons of the supply train, and along with them all four squadrons' banners, gifts from Napoleon's wife, Joséphine de Beauharnais when the regiment was still in Italy in 1802. The loss of the banners was recognized by lancers as an infamy. They decided - for honour's sake - to wash it away as soon as possible. The lancers' defeat became known all over Spain. It was probably the only defeat from the Spanish forces during all Peninsular War that truly hurt them, and dented their fame. In the nearest future "los infernos picadores" with all their impulsiveness and bravery would try to regain their former reputation among the ranks of the Armée d'Espagne.

The chance to avenge their honour came very soon. On 27 March 1809, in the battle of Ciudad Real they took the bridge, crushed four squares of Spanish infantry, and put them to flight. The next day in the Battle of Santa Cruz de Mudela, the lancers, without waiting for the rest of the Corps, crushed the same Spanish forces once again. On 18 September 1809, the mere presence of the "Hell Lancers" during the Battle of Ocaña, led to the same carabiñeros reales regiment leaving the battlefield.

At the beginning of May, Colonel Konopka left the regiment and traveled obviously summoned by the authorities to France. He stayed for some time in Sedan, which was the seat of the recruiting squadron, and returned to the regiment after fifteen months. The real effect of losing the standards was a refusal to give new ones to the regiment, but as Wojciechowski writes about the battle - There had finished our penance for the standards lost in Jovenes. On 18 June 1811, regiment was stripped from the Vistula Legion and redesignated as the 7e Régiment de Chevaulégers-lanciers of the regular French army.

Fate of the lost banners 

Wojciechowski later wrote about the fate of the lost banners:

It was true, the regiment lost its banners against explicit orders, according to which they should have been kept in safety of the regimental depot behind the lines. As a result, the regiment was not included – despite the recommendation of Joachim Murat – in the Imperial Guard and never obtained new ones.

In his report, the Spanish commanding officer, Count Cartaojal wrote on 29 March (it was published in Spanish papers 1 April) about losses of the Polish lancers:

In a later note to the Supreme Junta of Seville he added:

From his own words, it appears that Cartaojal took three of four regimental banners, and that two of these were in possession of a lancer, who – knowing the worth of them – tried to save them, but was killed during the fight. The fourth banner was most likely burned with the wagon train, when nobody could expect it.

The fates of the three banners from the end of the battle to the moment when two of them were hung as trophies in the Royal Chapel of Saint Francis Cathedral in Seville are unclear, but a few still existing documents offer some possible hypotheses.

It was possible all three Lancer banners were in the possession of the general staff of the Spanish Army, without any desire to present them in public until the Battle of Albuera. It is quite possible that the Spanish command decided to show the forgotten banners at this particular moment, to signify they were banners taken from the Vistula Lancers to heighten the morale of Spanish troops fighting during the battle.

This is probably how one should understand the words about "taking the Polish banners by the Regiment of Murcia", in General Lardizabal's report. However, the statement was false, as Spaniards did not take any standards or banners at Albuera, and in particular any banner of any squadron of the Polish lancers. Therefore, the note most likely refers to the banners from Yevenes.

Seven days later, Sebastian Llano, aide-de-camp of the Spanish general Blake, presented himself before the Cortes of Cádiz with a trophy – the banner of the 3rd squadron – and said: "... of the three standards taken from our enemies, I have the honour to present to Your Excellencies this one, as the homage to the Nation you represent". This banner was hung in the San Felipe Neri church in Cádiz, but later it vanished without a trace.

In 1889, J. Gestoso of Seville published - in the series "National Glory" - a colour reprint of the banner of the 1st squadron, along with the information that it was kept in "the Royal Chapel of Saint Francis in this town", as the "memorabilia" of the Battle of Bailén. A year later the same author, in his "Seville Guide", mentioned two Polish banners in the Royal Chapel, again connecting them with Bailén, unaware that Polish lancers were not involved in that battle; moreover that all trophies taken during that battle by the Spaniards were recovered by king Joseph Bonaparte in 1810.

Today, in the cathedral of Seville, there is only the banner of the 2nd Squadron, because the one which belonged to the 1st Squadron was removed (in unclear circumstances) around 1910 to the Musée de l'Armée in Paris, where it is kept without mention that it was a trophy of the Spanish forces.

Finally, there is also the fate of Colonel Konopka, who – against explicit orders – placed the regiment's banners in the wagons of the train. He risked a lot, even the loss of his position, but it looked like nothing happened: his travel to France (surely connected with the investigation into the case) took a long time, but without any visible consequences. After the Battle of Albuera – he was supposedly nominated a French General and Baron, and disappeared from the Vistula Lancers forever. Formations of the light cavalry of the Vistula Legion weren't formally Polish detachments.

Soon, as the grosmajor: This has sometimes been interpreted to mean that he was never promoted. More likely, it's just a proof that he was demoted in rank he became the instructor "of the lance" in the 1st Polish Light Cavalry Regiment of the Imperial Guard. During the Invasion of Russia, he gained the command of the newly created 3rd Lithuanian Light Cavalry Regiment of the Guard, but in October 1812, during the banquet in Słonim the day before the march out, was taken prisoner by the Russians. His imprisonment destroyed his health, and he died in the middle of January 1815. Other sources point the December 1814. as the newly nominated brigadier-general of the army of the Congress Poland.

Explanatory notes

Notes

References

Further reading

External links 
Polish Vistula Uhlans
The loss of Honor 
Battles of Spanish Campaign 

Battles of the Peninsular War
Military history of Poland
Battle of Yevenes
Battle of Yevenes
Battles involving Spain
March 1809 events